Vikki McGinn (born March 31, 1985) is an Irish female rugby union player. She replaced Niamh Kavanagh who was ruled out of the World Cup due to injury.

References

External links
Irish Rugby Profile

1985 births
Living people
Irish female rugby union players
Ireland women's international rugby union players